Dichlorodifluoromethane (R-12) is a colorless gas usually sold under the brand name Freon-12, and a chlorofluorocarbon halomethane (CFC) used as a refrigerant and aerosol spray propellant. Complying with the Montreal Protocol, its manufacture was banned in developed countries (non-article 5 countries) in 1996, and in developing countries (Article 5 countries) in 2010 out of concerns about its damaging effect on the ozone layer. Its only allowed usage is as a  fire retardant in submarines and aircraft. It is soluble in many organic solvents. R-12 cylinders are colored white.

Preparation
It can be prepared by reacting carbon tetrachloride with hydrogen fluoride in the presence of a catalytic amount of antimony pentachloride:

CCl4 + 2HF → CCl2F2 + 2HCl

This reaction can also produce trichlorofluoromethane (CCl3F), chlorotrifluoromethane (CClF3) and tetrafluoromethane (CF4).

History
Charles (Boss) Kettering, vice president of General Motors Research Corporation, was seeking a refrigerant replacement that would be colorless, odorless, tasteless, nontoxic, and nonflammable. He assembled a team that included Thomas Midgley, Jr., Albert Leon Henne, and Robert McNary. From 1930 to 1935, they developed dichlorodifluoromethane (CCl2F2 or R12), trichlorofluoromethane (CCl3F or R11), chlorodifluoromethane (CHClF2 or R22), trichlorotrifluoroethane (CCl2FCClF2 or R113), and dichlorotetrafluoroethane (CClF2CClF2 or R114), through Kinetic Chemicals which was a joint venture between DuPont and General Motors.

Use as an aerosol
The use of chlorofluorocarbons as aerosols in medicine, such as USP-approved salbutamol, has been phased out by the U.S. Food and Drug Administration. A different propellant known as hydrofluoroalkane, or HFA, which was not known to harm the environment, was chosen to replace it.

Retrofitting

R-12 was used in most refrigeration and vehicle air conditioning applications prior to 1994 before being replaced by 1,1,1,2-tetrafluoroethane (R-134a), which has an insignificant ozone depletion potential. Automobile manufacturers started using R-134a instead of R-12 in 1992–1994. When older units leak or require repair involving removal of the refrigerant, retrofitment to a refrigerant other than R-12 (most commonly R-134a which has a global warming potential 3,400 times that of carbon dioxide) is required in some jurisdictions. The United States does not require automobile owners to retrofit their systems; however, taxes on ozone-depleting chemicals coupled with the relative scarcity of the original refrigerants on the open market make retrofitting the only economical option. Retrofitment requires a system flush and a new filter/dryer or accumulator, and may also involve the installation of new seals and/or hoses made of materials compatible with the refrigerant being installed. Mineral oil used with R-12 is not compatible with R-134a. Some oils designed for conversion to R-134a are advertised as compatible with residual R-12 mineral oil. Another replacement for R-12 is the highly flammable, but truly drop-in HC-12a, whose flammability has led to injuries and deaths.

Dangers
Aside from its immense environmental impacts, R12, like most chlorofluoroalkanes, forms phosgene gas when exposed to a naked flame.

Properties
Table of thermal and physical properties of saturated liquid refrigerant 12:

Gallery

References

External links
 NOAA/ESRL CFC-12 global measurements
 
 Overview of Freon-12 and some of its environmental problems
 MSDS at Oxford University
 Thermochemistry data at chemnet.ru
 IR absorption spectra
 CDC - NIOSH Pocket Guide to Chemical Hazards

Halomethanes
Chlorofluorocarbons
Ozone depletion
Greenhouse gases
Refrigerants
Belgian inventions